Ya'akov Cohen (born 13 July 1953) is an Israeli rabbi and former politician.

Biography
Born in Bnei Brak, Cohen was ordained as a rabbi at the Beit Talmud LeHora'a. He founded the Hassidic Bnei Brak Seminary in 1980 and served as a director until 2001.

For the 2006 Knesset elections he was placed sixth on the United Torah Judaism list, and became a Knesset member when the party won six seats. He resigned his seat on 31 July 2008 as part of a rotation agreement between the Agudat Yisrael and Degel HaTorah factions of UTJ, and was replaced by Uri Maklev (Cohen belongs to Agudat Yisrael).

Ya'akov Cohen denounced 2006 Jerusalem gay rights rally stating "This isn't the gay pride parade but the disgrace parade!"

References

External links
 

1953 births
Living people
Agudat Yisrael politicians
Israeli Hasidic rabbis
Jewish Israeli politicians
Members of the 17th Knesset (2006–2009)
Rabbinic members of the Knesset
Rabbis in Bnei Brak
United Torah Judaism politicians